KMOO-FM (99.9 FM) is a radio station broadcasting a Classic country format. Licensed to Mineola, Texas, United States, the station serves the Tyler-Longview area.  "K-Moo" is currently owned by Hightower Radio, Inc.  Studios and transmitter are located in Mineola.

History 
KMOO-FM began broadcasting on  December 16, 1977. It was owned by Sam and Joyce Curry, and was the FM sister station to  KMOO. Under Curry's tenure, the station was referred to by its ownership and on air personalities solely as, "K M Double O," and not allowed to call the station "KMOO," with the last three letters pronounced in a manner similar to a noise made by cattle.

Sam Curry sold the station in  when he planned to embark on a race for Wood County Judge as a Democrat, a race he ultimately lost.

References

External links

MOO-FM
Country radio stations in the United States
Mass media in Wood County, Texas